Colonel Bogey is a 1948 fantasy film directed by Terence Fisher, and starring Jack Train and Mary Jerrold. The spirit of a home's former owner refuses to pass on.

It was shot at Highbury Studios as a second feature.

Cast
Jack Train as Uncle James
Mary Jerrold as Aunt Mabel
Jane Barrett as Alice Graham
John Stone as Wilfred Barriteau
Ethel Coleridge as Emily
Hedli Anderson as Millicent	
Bertram Shuttleworth as Cabby	
Charles Rolfe as Soldier	
Sam Kydd as Soldier	
Dennis Woodford as Chemist

Critical reception
TV Guide called the film a "Pleasant little fantasy," rating it two out of five stars.

References

External links
 

1948 films
British fantasy films
Films directed by Terence Fisher
Films shot at Highbury Studios
British black-and-white films
1940s British films